The 2015 World Cup Taekwondo Team Championships was the 7th edition of the World Cup Taekwondo Team Championships, and was held in Mexico City, Mexico from December 8 to December 9, 2014.

Teams were allowed to augment their squads with maximum two athletes from other countries.

Medalists

 Foreign athletes are shown in italic.

Men

Preliminary round

Group A

Group B

Knockout round

Women

Preliminary round

Group A

Group B

Knockout round

References

1st day results
2nd day results

External links
Official website

World Cup
Taekwondo World Cup
World Cup Taekwondo Team Championships
Taekwondo Championships